The Philippine Science High School - Calabarzon Region Campus (PSHS-CBZRC) is the 14th campus of the Philippine Science High School System located at Brgy. Sampaga, Batangas City. The campus specializes in Integrated Sciences, Mathematics, and Computer Sciences while still pertaining to the standard humanitarian subjects such as Physical Education and Music. The school's expansive and intensive nature of studies along with skilled and handpicked teachers has garnered it a reputation of producing some of the best students in the field of Science and Mathematics in both the region and the Philippines. The campus, having only started its groundbreaking ceremony on March 10, 2016, is still under construction with multiple unfinished facilities.

History
The campus adheres to Republic Act 3661, authored by Congressman Virgilio Afable and signed by President Diosdado Macapagal in 1964. It states that the campus, following the same curriculum as the original campus in Quezon City, has “to offer on a free scholarship basis a secondary course with emphasis on subjects pertaining to service with the end in view of preparing its students for a science career.”

The PSHS-CBZRC stands on a 5-hectare open lot at Brgy. Sampaga, Batangas City in the administrative region of Calabarzon, Philippines. The location of the Calabarzon campus was donated in March 2013. The campus location was formally finalized in November 2013 when then Department of Science and Technology Secretary (DOST) Mario Montejo and the school's board of trustees signed Resolution No. 2013-11-34, establishing the regional campus. Previously, the campus was located in Bahay Kaalaman Bldg., Batangas National High School Compound, Rizal Avenue, Batangas City before being transferred permanently to its current location in 2017.

Admission 
Before the pandemic, for one to be able to join the ranks of the students that are allowed to enroll, one must garner a passing score in the school's National Competitive Examination (NCE). Students all over the country take the test, and the top 240 examinees are to be considered "principal qualifiers" and have the option to enroll in the Main Campus while the top 90 or 120 from each region may join their respective regional campuses.

As of 2021, the Philippine Science High School System has adopted Requirements for Admission, Criteria, and Evaluation (RACE), an alternative selection process for its scholars to "prevent the spread of COVID-19 among thousands of examinees who gather in testing sites across the country."

Education 
PSHS-CBZRC, being one of the top high schools in the region, has a unique and calculated academic system that produces award-winning and successful students. The system mainly focuses on science and mathematics. Its senior high school is exclusive to the STEM academic track. 

Since the implementation of the K-12 program in the Philippines in 2013 by then President Benigno Aquino III, the PSHS has designated a 6-year curriculum to "nurture scholars to become holistic individuals who are humanistic in spirit, global in perspective, patriotic in orientation, and well-prepared to pursue a STEM career which will contribute to nation-building through a program that is rooted in sound educational principles and geared towards excellence, it is anticipated that PSHS graduates are empowered 21st century learners with general capabilities that will prepare them to confidently pursue STEM courses as well as to become active and informed global citizens."

PSHS-CBZRC uses a grading system similar to the major universities in the country. Grading is cumulative, taking two-thirds of the grade earned for the current quarter (i.e. the transmuted grade, such as 1.25) and adding it to a third of the transmuted grade from the previous quarter. 1.00 is the highest grade while 5.00 is a failing mark. 2.50 is the passing grade and any grade lower than this is termed substandard. The general weighted average (GWA) of the student should be 2.25 or better to be in good standing. 

The "percentage range" is used in actual computations of grades while the "equivalent range" is used in translating the grades for use outside of the system (e.g. application to colleges/universities).

Every quarter, students who garner a general weighted average (GWA) of 1.50 or higher are included in an honor roll known as the Director's List.

Sources

External links
PSHS official website
PSHS Calabarzon Region Campus official website

Philippine Science High School System
Schools in Batangas City
High schools in Batangas